Sir John Leonard Stone, OBE, QC (6 November 1896 – 3 January 1978) was the last British chief justice of the High Court of Bombay, serving from 30 September 1943 until 1948.

Educated at Malvern College, he served in the First World War and in the Greco-Turkish War of 1919–1922. Called to the bar at Gray's Inn in 1923, he joined the Lincoln's Inn Bar in 1931, becoming a Bencher of Gray's Inn in 1942 and its treasurer in 1956. He served in the British Home Guard during the Second World War, until 1943, when he was appointed Chief Justice of the Bombay High Court. He was appointed an OBE in the 1943 New Year Honours (citing his Home Guard service) and knighted in the 1943 Birthday Honours.  He was appointed a King's Counsel in 1948.

He subsequently served as Vice-Chancellor of the County Palatine of Lancaster from 1948 to 1963.

See also 
List of Chief Justices of the Bombay High Court

References 

 Chief Justice Sir Leonard Stone - from the Bombay High Court website
Who's Who, A&C Black, 1977–1978

1896 births
1978 deaths
Members of Gray's Inn
Members of Lincoln's Inn
Knights Bachelor
Officers of the Order of the British Empire
Chief Justices of the Bombay High Court
British India judges
People educated at Malvern College
British people in colonial India
King's Counsel